Alvameline (Lu 25-109) is a M1 receptor agonist and M2/M3 receptor antagonist that was under investigation for the treatment of Alzheimer's disease, but produced poor results in clinical trials and was subsequently discontinued.

Synthesis 

Alkylation of nicotinonitrile (accessible from nicotinamide) (1) with methyl iodide affords the N-methylpyridinium salt (2). The reduction of this intermediate with sodium borohydride gives 3-cyano-N-methyl-1,2,5,6-tetrahydropyridine [5657-66-9] (3). Reaction with ethyl chloroformate results in N-demethylation and consequent formation of the corresponding carbamate [120241-16-9] (4). The nitrile group is then transformed to a tetrazole by reaction with sodium azide in the presence of aluminum chloride giving CID:9991151 (5). The surrogate acid is then alkylated with ethyl iodide to afford CID:10106197 (6). Treatment with acid then removes the carbamate on the ring nitrogen giving Lu-25-077 [221549-70-8] (7). The methyl group on the piperidine ring restored using formaldehyde and formic acid under standard Eschweiler–Clarke conditions, yielding alvameline (8).

See also 
 Milameline
 Sabcomeline
 Tazomeline
 Xanomeline

References 

Muscarinic agonists
Tetrahydropyridines
Tetrazoles